The list of Louisiana parishes by French-speaking population was created from the 2000 Census of the United States.  Census collects data on languages spoken at home by inhabitants of Louisiana five years of age or more. Responses "French" and "Cajun" are included.

Statewide, out of a population 5 years and older of 4,152,122, some 179,750 people reported French as their home language, while 14,365 reported "Cajun". A further 4,465 who reported French Creole are not counted below.

According to the 2010 US Census, there was a huge decline in the number of French speakers in Louisiana. It now stands at 115,183 which equates to 2.8% of the state population.

Complete Parish listing

See also 
 French language in the Americas

Notes

References

Geography of Louisiana
French-American culture in Louisiana
Frenchspeakingparishes
French language in the United States
Languages of Louisiana